Atrypanius is a genus of beetles in the family Cerambycidae, first described by Henry Walter Bates in 1864.

Species 
Atrypanius contains the following species:
 Atrypanius albocinctus Melzer, 1930
 Atrypanius ambiguus Melzer, 1930
 Atrypanius audureaui Roguet, 2021
 Atrypanius binoculatus (Bates, 1864)
 Atrypanius cinerascens (Bates, 1864)
 Atrypanius conspersus (Germar, 1824)
 Atrypanius corticalis (Bates, 1864)
 Atrypanius cretiger (White, 1855)
 Atrypanius estebani Audureau & Demez, 2015
 Atrypanius exilis (Bates, 1885)
 Atrypanius haldemani (LeConte, 1852)
 Atrypanius heyrovskyi (Gilmour, 1960)
 Atrypanius implexus (Erichson, 1847)
 Atrypanius infimus (Bates, 1885)
 Atrypanius irrorellus Bates, 1885
 Atrypanius jauffreti Santos-Silva, 2021
 Atrypanius leucopygus (Bates, 1872)
 Atrypanius lignarius (Bates, 1864)
 Atrypanius lineatocollis (Bates, 1863)
 Atrypanius maculosus (Nascimento & Heffern, 2018)
 Atrypanius polyspilus (White, 1855)
 Atrypanius pulchellus (Bates, 1863)
 Atrypanius remissus (Erichson, 1847)
 Atrypanius satipoensis (Audureau & Demez, 2015)
 Atrypanius scitulus (Germar, 1824)
 Atrypanius scutellatus (Bates, 1866)
 Atrypanius spretus (Bates, 1864)
 Atrypanius unpanus Juarez-Noe & Gonzalez-Coronado, 2021
 Atrypanius venustus (Bates, 1863)

References

Acanthocinini
Cerambycidae genera